Werkspoor N.V. was the shortened, and later the official name of the Nederlandsche Fabriek van Werktuigen en Spoorwegmaterieel. It was a Dutch machine factory, known for rolling stock, (ship) steam engines, and diesel engines. It was a successor of the company Van Vlissingen en Dudok van Heel, later named Koninklijke Fabriek van Stoom- en andere Werktuigen. In 1954 Werkspoor was merged with Stork.

Founded as Nederlandsche Fabriek van Werktuigen en spoorwegmaterieel  

In March 1890 the predecessor of Werkspoor asked for an automatic stay. After many years of heavy losses the financial world lacked confidence in this predecessor, the Koninklijke Fabriek van Stoom- en andere Werktuigen. What was needed was a radical restructuring and new leadership. Because of the national and city interest, authorities intervened to bring this about. The mayor of Amsterdam G. van Tienhoven succeeded in engaging C.T. Stork (owner of the machine factory Stork) in the operation and to provide a good manager.

On 22 May 1891 a new company was founded named Nederlandsche Fabriek van Werktuigen en spoorwegmaterieel. (In Dutch: Dutch factory for tools and rolling stock). It bought all assets of its predecessor for 1,500,500 guilders, of which 920,500 went to a mortgage on the grounds of the factory. On 1 June 1891 C.H. Strumphler started as new CEO. The supervisory board was formed by: L. Serrurier of the municipal government of Amsterdam, C.T. Stork member of the Dutch senate, Jacob Theodoor Cremer and W.J. Geertsema of the House of Representatives, and two members representing a Dutch railroad: J.A. Roessingh van Iterson of the Hollandsche IJzeren Spoorweg-Maatschappij and H.J. Nivel of the Maatschappij tot Exploitatie van Staatsspoorwegen

When the company (re)opened on 1 June 1891 it had 124 employees. New work came in slowly at first. The confidence in the old factory had been damaged, and had to be regained by the new factory. It gained some small orders for the navy, but rolling stock manufacture helped the company through the difficult first years. The company also had to spend a lot of money to restore the lack of maintenance of buildings and machinery during the last years of the Koninklijke Fabriek. A lot of machines were too old and too costly to operate and had to be replaced. The complex also required multiple connections to the railroad system. In 1893 J.T. Cremer was approached to found a new shipyard, which became the Nederlandsche Scheepsbouw Maatschappij. It meant that the company lost the slipways in which so much had been invested. However, it gained a neighbor that was much better in building ships, and required a steady stream of ship engines.

In 1929 the telegraphy address Werkspoor would become the official name of the company. In 1954 Werkspoor was joined with Stork and became part of Verenigde Machinefabrieken Stork-Werkspoor (VMF).

Activities of Werkspoor

Rolling stock 

The Dutch railroad companies had provided crucial support for founding the new company in 1891. Their goal was that the new company would manufacture rolling stock. So the company started this trade, even though it had only one employee who still had experience with this from the previous company. Therefore the manufacture of rolling stock was initially limited to railroad cars and the like. The Netherlands–South African Railway Company ordered a big number of cargo cars at good prices, an order that was very helpful for the new company.

In 1897 a big order by the Netherlands–South African Railway Company for 40 locomotives led to a breakthrough. It led to the construction of three big halls on Oostenburg designed by A.L. van Gendt, and the company producing locomotives instead of only wagons. In 1913 the manufacture of railroad cars and steel constructions moved to Industrial park Lage Weide in Zuilen, now a suburb of Utrecht. A new factory complex for up to 6000 employees was built, and to house them the village Nieuw-Zuilen was founded which is now the city quarters Elinkwijk and De Lessepsbuurt. In Utrecht some famous bridges were built, like the Waalbrug in Nijmegen and the Bommelse Brug near Zaltbommel.

In the first years after World War II there was a lot of work to repair the Dutch railroad and tramway stock. Werkspoor also built a lot of new locomotives and carriages for the Dutch railroads. Orders were often shared with Beijnes in Haarlem and Allan of Rotterdam. With the independence of Indonesia Werkspoor lost a big market for its railway products. In 1951 this was temporarily compensated by a big order of 90 locomotives and 400 carriages from Argentina. It created work for seven years, and drove the number of employees to 5,000. By 1968 Werkspoor had so much work (e.g. plan V for the Dutch railways, and a big series of trams for Amsterdam), that it forwarded work to the German company Duewag. Nevertheless, the long term perspective for the rolling stock division was not bright, because it only delivered to the Dutch market. In 1972 the division was closed.

Machinery 
Next to producing rolling stock, Werkspoor also remained active in machinery, and in particular ship engines. In its first years she built the machines for the protected cruisers HNLMS Koningin Wilhelmina der Nederlanden, HNLMS Holland (1896) and HNLMS Utrecht (1898).

In 1910 it produced the first diesel engine for a sea-going ship, the Vulcanus, for the Bataafse Petroleum Maatschappij. In the early 20th century it also started to produce cooling machines in license from Linde AG. In 1960 a new big factory hall was built on the Amsterdam–Rhine Canal in Utrecht. It was to be used for the construction of large boilers and machines, the Apparatenhal, since 2013 known as Werkspoorkathedraal. In 1989 the engine division Stork-Werkspoor-Diesel (SWD) was bought by the Finnish company Wärtsilä.

Aircraft 

Werkspoor was somewhat active in Dutch aeronautical industry. In 1925 it was involved in the construction of the first Dutch helicopter by Albert Gillis von Baumhauer. In 1930 KLM executive Albert Plesman ordered Werkspoor to create a cargoplane after a design by Joop Carley. The development of the Werkspoor Jumbo in cooperation with Pander & Son was plagued by the engine overheating. In 1931 the Jumbo made its first flight. The only specimen flew two years as a cargo plane for the KLM, and then seven years as a trainer. At the start of World War II the plane was lost in a bombardment.

Werkspoor worked as a subcontractor for Fokker in the late 1930s. By February 1939 500 of the 2,000 employees working for Fokker were working at the Werkspoor location Zuilen. These were woodworkers, that had been moved because there was not enough room for them in the rapidly expanding Fokker factory in Amsterdam. The wings of the Fokker Fokker G.I, first flight 1937, were made of wood. The wings of the first G.I. were not built in Zuilen. Werkspoor did built wing parts for the Fokker G.I.

In the 1950s the Netherlands, Belgium and the United States planned to build 460 Hawker Hunter fighter jets. In the context of a NATO plan part of this would be financed by America. The engines would be built by FN in Belgium. For constructing the airplane a consortium was founded.

 Fokker: principal contractor, also responsible for final assembly of all the Dutch and part of the Belgian aircraft. Construction of the rear-part of the airframe.
 Werkspoor: construction of central part of the airframe
 Aviolanda: construction of the front of the airframe 
 Société Anonyme Belge de Constructiona Aéronautiques (Sabca): bouw van vleugels, construction of the wings and landing gear (license Dowty)
 Avions-Fairey: final assembly of part of the Belgian planes

Busses 

Werkspoor built busses before and after the Second World War. In the late 1940s 195 Crossley busses were built for local public transport companies owned by the Nederlandse Spoorwegen. After that Werkspoor did not build any busses, but after seven years it re-entered the market by a request of the Nederlandse Spoorwegen, that wanted to prevent the big coachbuilder Verheul from gaining a monopoly. Verheul was able to build busses with a self-supporting body, and Nederlandse Spoorwegen thought that Werkspoor should also be able to do so. From 1956-1962 Nederlandse Spoorwegen and its subsidiaries received 477 Leyland-Werkspoor Bolramer busses. In 1962 Werkspoor sold the bus division to Hainje in Heerenveen, now part of VDL Groep.

Radio telescope 
In 1956 Werkspoor together with Philips, the Royal Netherlands Meteorological Institute and some Dutch universities built the Dwingeloo Radio Observatory.

Hyperbaric chamber 
In 1959 Werkspoor the first pressure chamber for hyperbaric medicine used for medical purposes. Customer was the Wilhelmina Gasthuis in Amsterdam. After the Wilhelmina Gasthuis became part of the Academic Medical Center in Amsterdam, the chamber moved to the Meibergdreef, where it is still used.

Nuclear reactor and ultracentrifuges
The first experiments with the use of ultracentrifuges for enriching uranium were executed by the Dutch physicist Dr. Jacob Kistemaker in the basements of Werkspoor in Amsterdam. This finally led to founding the uranium enrichment plant Urenco in Almelo in 1969. In the 1970s Werkspoor built the reactor pressure vessel for the KEMA Suspensie Test Reactor (KSTR), an experimental nuclear reactor used by KEMA in Arnhem from 1974-1979 for studies.

Legacy 

In Amsterdam there was a Werkspoormuseum. Since 1950 it was housed the former ropewalk of the Dutch East Indies company. This 500 meter long building called Lijnbaan dates from 1660. The lower level had items from the Dutch East Indies company, the first floor treated the industrial heritage of Werkspoor. The museum was also a representative building for Stork, but was not open to the public, and was finally closed in 2011. Owner Stork then looked for a new place to house the collection in 2012.

On 12 September 2009 the Museum van Zuilen was opened on the de Amsterdamsestraatweg 569 in Utrecht, housing a Werkspoor-collection, focused on the Utrecht factory. They moved to a former ‘apparatenhal’ of Werkspoor at Schaverijstraat 13, Zuilen-Utrecht in June 2020.

Overview of rolling stock built by Werkspoor 
An overview of rolling stock built by Werkspoor after World War II. Ordered by customer.

Nederlandse Spoorwegen

Locomotives
 Locomotor NS Class 200/300 series (except 281-306) ('Sik')
 Diesel locomotives NS Class 400
 Diesel locomotives NS 450
 Diesel locomotives NS 2600
 Electrical locomotives NS Class 1000 together with SLM/Oerlikon Contraves
 Electrical locomotives NS Class 1200 together with Baldwin Locomotive Works/Westinghouse Electric Company

Trainsets 
 Plan A (Mat '46) - together with Beijnes
 Plan B (Mat '46) - together with Allan and Beijnes
 Plan AB (Mat '46)
 Plan F (Mat '54) - together with Allan and Beijnes
 Plan G (Mat '54) - together with Allan
 Plan P (Mat '54)
 Plan Q (Mat '54)
 Benelux-trainsets (Mat '57)
 Plan U (Dieseldrieën)
 Plan X (Diesel-1 en 2) - Samen met Allan and Beijnes nickname: Blauwe Engelen
 Plan T (Mat '64)
 Plan V (Mat '64) Bouw t/m 1972 (treinstel 840). Daarna door Talbot
 Plan mP (Motorpost)
 SBB-CFF-FFS RAm TEE I and NS DE4 (Trans Europe Express, together with SBB)

Carriages
 Plan D - Together with Beijnes
 Plan E - Together with Beijnes
 Plan N
 Plan W

GVB (Amsterdam) 
 Trams: Amsterdam drieasser-trams (numbers 491-550 and 951-1000).
 Trams: gelede wagens: Amsterdamse gelede trams (Beijnes/Werkspoor)|5G, 6G, 7G, numbers 653-669, 670-699 rear wagons by Düwag and 700-724.

HTM (Den Haag) 
 Trams: serie 201-216 (1948, Haagse vierasser, nickname "Zwitsers")

RET (Rotterdam) 
 Metrotype M|Metro: 5000-series.
 Trams: 300- and 600/1600-series.

Staatsmijnen 
 Diesel locomotives DHB 450/500 (SM 171-183 (500 hp) and SM 191-196 (650 hp)
 Cargo cars: 2-axle zelflossers

Gallery of Werkspoor products

Miscellaneous

Rolling stock

Trams

References 
  
  
 H. de Jong: De locomotieven van Werkspoor. De Alk, Alkmaar, 1986. 
 W. van Scharenburg: Werkspoor Utrecht-Zuilen Deel I Trams en Treinen. 
 W. van Scharenburg: Werkspoor Utrecht-Zuilen Deel II Bruggen, Montage, Vrachtauto's, Boten, Bussen enz.

Notes

External links 

 Museum van Zuilen: Has info on the Werkspoor factory in Utrecht (Zuilen)
 Langs de Rails: Many photos about Werkspoor rolling stock
 Werkspoor: Some photo's of Werkspoor in the 1950s
 Industriespoor: Diesel locomotives near the coal mines (DSM)
 Andere tijden: Treinen van Nederlandse bodem - geschiedenis24.nl
 Movie about the Werkspoormuseum
 Movie about assembling the NS Locomotive 1200 at Werkspoor 1950s
 Movie 100 jaar werkspoor in het hart van Zuilen"

Werkspoor
Rolling stock manufacturers of the Netherlands
Engine manufacturers of the Netherlands
Defunct aircraft manufacturers of the Netherlands